Marek Čanecký (born 17 June 1988 in Banská Bystrica) is a Slovak cyclist, who currently rides for Slovak amateur team BRS-Kaktus Bike.

Major results

2007
 9th Grand Prix Bradlo
2009
 3rd Time trial, National Under-23 Road Championships
 10th Overall Grand Prix Bradlo
2010
 1st  Time trial, National Under-23 Road Championships
 8th Raiffeisen Grand Prix
 9th Overall Coupe des nations Ville Saguenay
2011
 1st Stage 1 Tour of Marmara
 2nd Overall Grand Prix Chantal Biya
1st Stage 2
 3rd Road race, National Road Championships
 3rd Tour of Vojvodina I
 7th Overall Tour of Szeklerland
2012
 1st  Mountains classification Grand Prix of Sochi
2013
 1st  Mountains classification Oberösterreich Rundfahrt
 4th Road race, National Road Championships
 9th Scandinavian Race Uppsala
2014
 3rd Kerékpárverseny, Visegrad 4 Bicycle Race
2015
 1st Stage 2 Tour de Hongrie
 3rd Rund um Sebnitz
 9th Raiffeisen Grand Prix
2016
 National Road Championships
1st  Time trial
4th Road race
 1st Kerékpárverseny, Visegrad 4 Bicycle Race
 4th Croatia–Slovenia
2017
 National Road Championships
1st  Time trial
4th Road race
 6th Raiffeisen Grand Prix
 7th Overall Istrian Spring Trophy
2018
 1st  Time trial, National Road Championships
 9th Overall Grand Prix Cycliste de Gemenc
2019
 2nd Road race, National Road Championships
 2nd Overall Grand Prix Chantal Biya
1st Points classification
1st Stages 2 & 3
 3rd Overall Tour du Sénégal
 9th Overall In the Steps of Romans
1st Mountains classification
2020
 7th Overall Belgrade–Banja Luka
2021
 7th Kerékpárverseny, Visegrad 4 Bicycle Race
2022
 National Road Championships
2nd Time trial
4th Road race,

References

External links

1988 births
Living people
Slovak male cyclists
Sportspeople from Banská Bystrica
European Games competitors for Slovakia
Cyclists at the 2019 European Games